William Crawford (1784 – February 28, 1849) was a United States district judge of the United States District Court for the Middle District of Alabama, the United States District Court for the Northern District of Alabama and the United States District Court for the Southern District of Alabama.

Education and career

Born in 1784 in Louisa County, Virginia, Crawford attended Hampden–Sydney College and read law. He entered private practice, then served as a land commissioner in Florida. He was a Virginia militia lieutenant from 1812 to 1814, during the War of 1812. He was a land commissioner in Louisiana starting in 1812. He was United States Attorney for the District of Mississippi Territory starting in 1814. He was United States Attorney for the District of Alabama from 1817 to 1824. He was United States Attorney for the Southern District of Alabama from 1824 to 1826. He resumed private practice in St. Stephens, Alabama. He was clerk of the United States District Court for the District of Alabama. He was a member of the Alabama Senate from 1825 to 1826.

Federal judicial service

Crawford was nominated by President John Quincy Adams on May 5, 1826, to a joint seat on the United States District Court for the Northern District of Alabama and the United States District Court for the Southern District of Alabama vacated by Judge Charles Tait. He was confirmed by the United States Senate on May 22, 1826, and received his commission the same day. Crawford was assigned by operation of law to additional and concurrent service on the United States District Court for the Middle District of Alabama on February 6, 1839, to a new seat authorized by 5 Stat. 315. His service terminated on February 28, 1849, due to his death in Mobile, Alabama.

References

Sources
 

1784 births
1849 deaths
Alabama state senators
United States Attorneys for the District of Alabama
United States Attorneys for the Southern District of Alabama
Judges of the United States District Court for the Northern District of Alabama
Judges of the United States District Court for the Southern District of Alabama
Judges of the United States District Court for the Middle District of Alabama
United States federal judges appointed by John Quincy Adams
19th-century American judges
Hampden–Sydney College alumni
United States federal judges admitted to the practice of law by reading law